Frederick Madison Roberts (September 14, 1879 – July 19, 1952) was an American newspaper owner and editor, educator and business owner; he became a politician, the first known man of African American descent elected to the California State Assembly.  He served there for 16 years and became known as "dean of the assembly."  He has been honored as the first person of African-American descent to be elected to public office among the states on the West Coast.

Roberts was a great-grandson of Sally Hemings of Monticello and President Thomas Jefferson.

Early life and education
Roberts was born on September 14, 1879, in Chillicothe, Ohio, the son of Andrew Jackson Roberts (1852–1927), a graduate of Oberlin College, and Ellen Wayles Hemings (1856–1940), the daughter of Madison Hemings and Mary Hughes McCoy, a free woman of color. Ellen was 5'10" with blue eyes, and the granddaughter of Sally Hemings and Thomas Jefferson. (When the Jefferson biographer Fawn Brodie saw a family photo of Ellen, she said she could see the strong resemblance to Jefferson.)

When Frederick was six, his family moved in 1885 to Los Angeles, where his father established the first black-owned mortuary in the city. The Roberts had a second son, William Giles Roberts. They and their descendants became prominent in the Los Angeles area, with a strong tradition of college education, and working in public service. Frederick Roberts attended Los Angeles High School and became its first known graduate of African-American descent.

Roberts began college at the University of Southern California (USC) where he majored in pre-law. He continued at Colorado College, where he graduated. He also attended the Barnes-Worsham School of Embalming and Mortuary Science.

Career and civic life
In 1908 Roberts started editing the Colorado Springs Light newspaper.  While in Colorado, he also served as deputy assessor for El Paso County. He went to Mound Bayou, Mississippi where he served some years as principal of Mound Bayou Normal and Industrial Institute, one of a number of schools founded for African Americans in the segregated state system.

In 1912, Roberts returned to Los Angeles, where he founded The New Age Dispatch newspaper  (later called New Age), which he edited until 1948. When he partnered with his father in the mortuary business, they named it A.J. Roberts & Son. Eventually he took it over.

As a newspaper editor and business owner, Roberts became a prominent leader in the growing African-American community of Los Angeles. In the 20th century, people arrived in the Great Migration out of the South to northern, midwestern and western states. He belonged to a Methodist church. He also became a member of the National Association for the Advancement of Colored People (NAACP) and the Urban League, associations established in the early 20th century to work for political and civil rights for blacks.

Marriage and family
In 1921 Roberts married Pearl Hinds, who had studied at the Boston Conservatory of Music. They had daughters Gloria, who became a professional classical pianist, and Patricia, who lived in Los Angeles.

Political career
In 1918 Roberts was elected to the California State Assembly from the 62nd District as a Republican in a hard-fought campaign, during which his chief rival made racial slurs against him. While in office, Roberts sponsored legislation to establish the University of California at Los Angeles and improve public education, and proposed several civil rights and anti-lynching measures.  In June 1922, he welcomed Black Nationalist leader Marcus Garvey of the UNIA to Los Angeles and rode in his parade car.

Roberts was re-elected repeatedly and served a continuous total of 16 years, becoming known as the "dean of the assembly." He was a friend of Earl Warren, governor of California who became Chief Justice of the United States. In the 1934 mid-term elections, after the election of Democrat Franklin Delano Roosevelt as president two years previously in the midst of the Great Depression, Roberts was defeated by a Democratic African-American candidate, Augustus F. Hawkins. Following his 1934 California State Assembly defeat, Roberts ran unsuccessfully for the United States House of Representatives on two occasions. Until then, no African American had yet been elected to represent California in the United States Congress.

Beginning in the late 1930s and the early 1940s, the second wave of the Great Migration brought tens of thousands of African Americans from the Southern United States to the Los Angeles area for jobs in the growing defense industries. In 1946, Roberts campaigned for the 14th Congressional District against incumbent Helen Gahagan Douglas, but she kept her seat. A few years later, Douglas lost a hotly contested U.S. Senate race to Republican Richard M. Nixon.

On the evening of July 18, 1952, a few days after attending the 1952 Republican National Convention, Roberts sustained serious injuries when the car he was driving was struck by another vehicle near his Los Angeles home. He died the following afternoon at Los Angeles County General Hospital. Roberts is interred at Evergreen Cemetery. He was survived by his wife and two daughters.

Legacy
 1957  - The city of Los Angeles dedicated Frederick M. Roberts Park, 4700 Honduras St., in his memory.
 February 25, 2002 - The California State Senate honored Frederick Madison Roberts for his contributions and service to the State of California, with a unanimous vote for Senate Resolution 26, authored by Senator Ray Haynes (R-Riverside).
 February 2006, Mervyn M. Dymally of the California State Legislature featured the biography of Frederick M. Roberts on his website to honor early political leaders as part of Black History Month.

See also
List of African-American officeholders (1900–1959)

Citations

External links
 California Legislative Black Caucus
 
 Join California Frederick M. Roberts

Further reading
 Delilah L. Beasley, Negro Trail Blazers of California, Los Angeles: 1919, pp. 137, 215–16. (An early picture of Roberts appears on p. 40.)
 Fawn M. Brodie, Thomas Jefferson: An Intimate History, New York: W.W. Norton & Co., 1974
 Annette Gordon-Reed, Thomas Jefferson and Sally Hemings: An American Controversy, Charlottesville: University of Virginia Press, 1998
 Annette Gordon-Reed, The Hemingses of Monticello: An American Family, New York: W.W. Norton & Co., 2008
 Shannon Lanier and Jane Feldman, Jefferson's Children: The Story of One American Family New York: Random House Books for Young Readers, 2000 (with photos of Jefferson descendants on both sides)

|-

Republican Party members of the California State Assembly
1879 births
1952 deaths
African-American state legislators in California
Road incident deaths in California
Politicians from Chillicothe, Ohio
Businesspeople from Los Angeles
Hemings family
Jefferson family
Burials at Evergreen Cemetery, Los Angeles
Politicians from Los Angeles
19th-century American people
20th-century American politicians
African-American men in politics